Pike County is  a county in the Commonwealth of Pennsylvania. It is part of Northeastern Pennsylvania. As of the 2020 census, the population was 58,535. Its county seat is Milford.

Pike County is included in the New York-Newark-Jersey City, NY-NJ-PA Metropolitan Statistical Area.

History

Pike County was named for General Zebulon Pike. It was organized on March 26, 1814 from part of Wayne County, Pennsylvania. Some English settlement in the area had started during the colonial years.

The longtime original inhabitants were the Lenape Native Americans, known by the English colonists as the Delaware Indians because their territory was along the Delaware River (as named by the colonists), as well as the coastal mid-Atlantic area. In 1694, Governor Benjamin Fletcher of the colony of New York sent Captain Arent Schuyler to investigate claims that the French were recruiting Indian allies for use against the English. In 1696, governor Fletcher authorized purchases of Indian land near the New York border by a number of citizens of Ulster County; their descendants became the first European settlers of what became Pike County.

Nicholas Depui was the first to settle in the area, in 1725. Thomas Quick moved to the area that would become Milford in 1733. Andrew Dingman settled on the Delaware River at the future site of Dingmans Ferry in 1735.  The early settlers got along well with the Lenape and traded with them. As settlement increased and their land practices encroached on Lenape uses, land disputes arose. The colonists' infamous Walking Purchase of 1737 swindled the Lenape out of more than half of present-day Pike County. As the Lenape realized what had happened, violent conflicts arose between them and the colonists.

Early in the nineteenth century, coal was discovered nearby in the area that would become Carbondale. This became especially significant as the British restricted export of British coal to the United States after the War of 1812, creating a fuel shortage in rapidly expanding New York City. To get the coal to New York, developers proposed a gravity railroad from Carbondale to Honesdale, along with a canal from Honesdale to the Hudson River at Kingston.

The state of New York approved the canal proposal in 1823. Work on the 108-mile (174 km) Delaware and Hudson Canal began in 1825 and was completed in 1828. The canal system, which terminated at the Hudson River near present-day Kingston, proved profitable. But the barges had to cross the Delaware via a rope ferry across a "slackwater dam," which created bottlenecks in the canal traffic and added greatly to the cost of transportation.

John Roebling proposed continuing the canal over the river as part of an aqueduct. Built in 1848, his innovative design required only three piers, where five would ordinarily have been required; this allowed ice floes and timber rafts to pass under with less damage to the bridge. Three other suspension aqueducts were subsequently built for the canal. Roebling's Delaware Aqueduct is still standing, possibly the oldest suspension bridge in America; it has been named a National Historic Landmark.

For fifty-one years, coal flowed to New York City via the canal. But the development of railroads, which were faster, cheaper, and operated even when the canals were frozen, brought the end of the canal era. The New York and Erie Railroad supplanted the canal and in 1898 the water route was abandoned.

From 1904 to 1926, Grey Towers in the borough of Milford, Pennsylvania was the site of summer field study sessions for the Master's program of the Yale School of Forestry, together with the Forester's Hall, a commercial building that was adapted and expanded for this purpose.

In 1926, PPL Corporation built a hydroelectric plant on Wallenpaupack creek at the former village of Wilsonville. The town was evacuated and now lies under Lake Wallenpaupack, created by a dam. A crew of 2,700 men worked for two years to complete the dam for the project at a cost of $1,026,000.  This required the acquisition of nearly a hundred properties, and a number of farms, barns, and homes were razed or moved. In addition, 17 miles (27 km) of roads and telephone lines were relocated, and a cemetery was moved to make way for the project.

The largely rural area of the county made it attractive as a country destination. Several camps were developed in the area of Milford, Pennsylvania, the county seat. It has several hundred late 19th and early 20th-century buildings that contribute to a National Historic District listed on the National Register of Historic Places. Yale ran summer field studies for its Master's program in forestry there from 1904 to 1926.

Since the late 20th century, Pike County has been the fastest-growing county in Pennsylvania; between 1990 and 2000, its population increased by 65.2%, and it grew an additional 16.9% between 2000 and 2004. The area has relatively low state and county taxes, and affordable housing. Interstate 80 and Interstate 84 provide rapid commutes to New York City's northern suburbs.

Geography

The terrain rises rapidly from the river valley in the east to the rolling foothills of the Poconos in the west. The highest point is one of two unnamed hills in Greene Township that top out at approximately 2,110 feet (643 m) above sea level. The lowest elevation is approximately 340 feet (103.6 m), at the confluence of the Bushkill and the Delaware rivers.

Adjacent counties
Sullivan County, New York (northeast)
Orange County, New York (east)
Sussex County, New Jersey (east)
Warren County, New Jersey (southeast)
Monroe County (southwest)
Wayne County (northwest)

Climate
Pike County has a humid continental climate that is warm-summer (Dfb), except along the Delaware River from Dingmans Ferry downriver, where it is hot-summer (Dfa). The hardiness zones are 5b and 6a. Average monthly temperatures in Milford range from 25.6 °F in January to 71.3 °F in July, while in Greentown they average from 22.8 °F in January to 68.5 °F in July.

National protected areas
 Delaware Water Gap National Recreation Area (part)
 Middle Delaware National Scenic River (part)
 Upper Delaware Scenic and Recreational River (part)

State protected areas
 Delaware State Forest (part)
 Promised Land State Park

Major highways

Demographics

As of the 2010 census, there were 57,369 people living in the county. The county was 88.6% Non-Hispanic White, 6.3% Black or African American, 0.5% Native American, 1.2% Asian, and 1.7% were two or more races. 10.2% of the population were of Hispanic or Latino ancestry.

As of the census of 2000, there were 46,302 people, 17,433 households, and 13,022 families living in the county. There were 34,681 housing units at an average density of 63 per square mile (24/km2). The racial makeup of the county was 93.10% White, 3.27% Black or African American, 0.24% Native American, 0.62% Asian, 0.01% Pacific Islander, 1.30% from other races, and 1.47% from two or more races.  5.00% of the population were Hispanic or Latino of any race. 18.9% were of German, 18.6% Irish, 18.5% Italian, 6.2% English and 5.3% Polish ancestry.

There were 17,433 households, out of which 34.40% had children under the age of 18 living with them, 63.50% were married couples living together, 7.60% had a female householder with no husband present, and 25.30% were non-families. 20.70% of all households were made up of individuals, and 8.40% had someone living alone who was 65 years of age or older.  The average household size was 2.63 and the average family size was 3.06.

In the county, the population was spread out, with 26.70% under the age of 18, 5.30% from 18 to 24, 27.70% from 25 to 44, 25.10% from 45 to 64, and 15.20% who were 65 years of age or older.  The median age was 40 years. For every 100 females, there were 99.30 males.  For every 100 females age 18 and over, there were 97.30 males.

As of Q4 2021, the median home value of all homes in Pike County is $214,981.

2020 Census

Politics and government

|}

As of November 2022, there were 44,664 registered voters in Pike County.

 Republican: 20,758 (46.68%)
 Democratic: 14,286 (31.99%)
 Other parties: 2,747 (6.15%)
 No party affiliation: 6,873 (15.39%)

The Republican Party has been historically dominant in county-level politics. For statewide and national-level candidates, Pike County has leaned toward the Republican Party. In 2000 Republican George W. Bush won 53% to Democrat Al Gore's 42%. In 2004 Republican George W. Bush won 58% to Democrat John Kerry's 40%. Population growth (and the ensuing influx of new residents) resulted in an increase in Democratic vote share in the county throughout the 2000s; in 2006, Democratic Governor Ed Rendell carried the county with 53% of the vote, while in 2008 Republican John McCain won by a margin of only 4% and the county split its tickets between Democratic and Republican statewide candidates. In the 2010s and 2020s, however, Pike, like much of the rest of Northeastern Pennsylvania, trended against Democratic candidates.

County Commissioners
Ron Schmalzle, ViceChairman, Republican 
Matthew M. Osterberg, Chairman, Republican
Steve Guccini, Democrat

Other county offices
Clerk of Courts and Prothonotary, Denise Fitzpatrick, Republican
Coroner, Christopher P. Brighton, Republican 
District Attorney, Raymond Tonkin, Republican
Recorder of Deeds and Register of Wills, Sharon Schroeder, Republican
Sheriff, Kerry Welsh
Treasurer, John Gilpin, Republican

State Representatives

Michael Peifer, Republican (139th district) - Blooming Grove, Dingman (partially), Greene, Lackawaxen, Milford, Palmyra, Shohola, and Westfall Townships, and Matamoras and Milford Boroughs
Rosemary Brown, Republican (189th district) - Delaware, Dingman (partially), Lehman, and Porter Townships

State Senator
Lisa Baker, Republican (20th district)

United States Representative
Matt Cartwright, Democrat (PA-8)

United States Senate
 John Fetterman, Democrat
 Bob Casey, Jr., Democrat

Education

Public school districts

Delaware Valley School District
East Stroudsburg Area School District (also in Monroe County)
Wallenpaupack Area School District (also Wayne County)

In 2011, Porter Township residents successfully petitioned the Pennsylvania Secretary of Education to transfer the township from East Stroudsburg Area School District to Wallenpaupack Area School District. The appeal by East Stroudsburg Area School District was heard by the Commonwealth Court in April 2012.

Private
Center for Developmental Disabilities of Pike Co, Ltd. – Milford
New Life Christian Day School – Matamoras
Sunshine Academy – Milford
 Kinderhaus Montessori of PA – Milford

Communities

Under Pennsylvania law, there are four types of incorporated municipalities: cities, boroughs, townships, and, in at most two cases, towns. The following boroughs and townships are located in Pike County:

Boroughs
Matamoras
Milford (county seat)

Townships

Blooming Grove
Delaware
Dingman
Greene
Lackawaxen
Lehman
Milford
Palmyra
Porter
Shohola
Westfall

Census-designated places

Birchwood Lakes
Conashaugh Lakes
Fawn Lake Forest
Gold Key Lake
Hemlock Farms
Masthope
Pine Ridge
Pocono Mountain Lake Estates
Pocono Ranch Lands
Pocono Woodland Lakes
Saw Creek
Sunrise Lake
Wild Acres Lakes

Population ranking
The population ranking of the following table is based on the 2020 census of Pike County.

† county seat

Notable natives and residents

 Louis Allen, a New York Army National Guard officer killed in a fragging incident in 2005 during the Iraq War.
 James Blish, Damon Knight, Judith Merril and Kate Wilhelm (Mrs. Knight), all science fiction writers]
 Vanessa Carlton - (born 1980) singer/songwriter
 Zane Grey - (1872-1939) author of western stories and novels including Riders of the Purple Sage
 Allyn Joslyn, stage and screen actor
Robert Litzenberger, professor emeritus at the Wharton School of the University of Pennsylvania
 Frank McCourt, author
 Charles Sanders Peirce, a philosopher and polymath, lived on a farm 3 miles from Milford, from 1887 until his 1914 death.
 Mary Pickford, silent film actress
 Gifford Pinchot - (1865–1946) was the first Chief of the United States Forest Service (1905–1910) and the Governor of Pennsylvania (1923–1927, 1931–1935).
 Al Pitrelli, guitarist
 Tom Quick, early settler
 Mary Cole Walling (1838–1925), patriot, lecturer
 Smoky Joe Wood, baseball pitcher.
 Marie Zimmermann designer and maker of jewelry and metalwork

See also
National Register of Historic Places listings in Pike County, Pennsylvania
 Camp Tamiment

References

External links
Official web site of Pike County
Pike County Public Library*Discover Pike, PA – History of Pike County
Pike County Chamber of Commerce

 
1814 establishments in Pennsylvania
Populated places established in 1814
Pocono Mountains
Counties of Appalachia
Counties in the New York metropolitan area